UnChild is the first collaboration album released between composer Hiroyuki Sawano and Aimer. It was released on June 25, 2014 in a limited and regular CD Only edition. Songs are English covers and rearrangements of various theme songs used in the anime Mobile Suit Gundam Unicorn.

Track listing

References 

2014 albums
Aimer albums
Hiroyuki Sawano albums
Defstar Records albums